Cyclos is the debut studio album of Dilate, released on February 13, 1996 by Hypnotic Records.

Music
Tracks from Cyclos were promoted somewhat strongly by Cleopatra Records and released on multiple various artists compilations. The track "Tangerine Sky" appeared on collections Space Box: 1970 & Beyond (Space, Krautrock & Acid Trips) by Cleopatra and the album's coda "Uduism" appeared on Ambient Time Travellers by Hypnotic Records. The track "Oblivium" was released on six various artist compilations: Space Daze 2000: A Mind Journey of Electronic Ambient Space Rock in 1996 by Cleopatra, This Is Space: The Space Daze Trilogy in 1997 by Cleopatra, DJ Technical's Hypnotic Illusions in 1997 by Hypnotic/Outloud, In to the Mix in 1997 by Hypnotic, Electronica Classix in 1999 by Alpha Wave, and Classic Electronica in 2001 by Big Eye Music.

The compositions "Colonies" and "Passage" had previously been used as codas on Vampire Rodents' Premonition and Lullaby Land studio albums, released in 1992 and 1993, respectively.

Reception

AllMusic awarded Cyclos four out of five possible stars. Offering a contrasting opinion was Keyboard, who was disappointed by the compositions and called them "cupcake music, in other words-not hard to describe, very little like either the Orb or Tangerine Dream, and not very important either, though perfectly adequate for airplay on Hearts of Space."
Magical Blend said while the album is not as captivating as its influences, namely Cluster and Tangerine Dream, the music is "a captivating listen-a perfect soundtrack for a hot summer night, with a chorus of crickets in the background."

Track listing

Personnel
Adapted from the Cyclos liner notes.

Dilate
 Victor Wulf – keyboards

Production
 Daniel Vahnke – management

Release history

References

External links 
 
 Cyclos at iTunes

1996 debut albums
Dilate (musical project) albums
Cleopatra Records albums
Hypnotic Records albums